Sydney Football Club may refer to the following clubs based in Sydney, Australia. These clubs which bear the city's name participate in distinct codes of football.

Sydney FC, a soccer (association football) club
Sydney Roosters, a rugby league club
Sydney Swans, an Australian rules football club
a defunct Australian rules (and later rugby union club), formed in 1865
Sydney Football Club (NSWAFL), an Australian rules football club formed in 1881 and closed in 1954